Musliyar is an honorific associated with South Indian, chiefly Malayali, scholars of Islam. Notable people with the surname include:

Abbas Musliyar, the founder of Al Madeena Islamic complex, Mangalore
Ali Musliyar (1861–1922), religious leader in moplah riot against British rule in the 1921–22 Malabar riots in Madras Presidency, British India
E.K. Hasan Musliyar (1929-82),  Sunni religious scholar from the state of Kerala, India
Anakkara Koyakutty Musliyar, Sunni religious scholar from the state of Kerala, India
Cherussery Zainuddeen Musliyar, Indian Sunni Muslim religious scholar from the state of Kerala
E. K. Aboobacker Musliyar, Sunni Muslim scholar and religious leader from Kerala, South India
K. Ali Kutty Musliyar, Islamic scholar, writer, orator, thinker and spiritual leader from Kerala, South India
Kalambadi Muhammad Musliyar (1934–2012), Sunni Muslim religious scholar from Kerala state, South India and former president of Samastha Kerala Jamiyyathul Ulama
Kanniyath Ahmed Musliyar, former president of Samastha Kerala Jamiyyathul Ulama, was a 20th-century scholar of Muslim Kerala
Sheikh Abubakr Ahmad Musliyar, Grand Mufti of India
Kotta Abdul Khader Musliyar, Islamic scholar hailing from Mogral, Kasaragod, district of Indian state Kerala and an active member of Samastha Kerala Jamiyyathul Ulama
Kutubi Muhammed Musliyar, scholar hailing from Kerala and advisor of Samastha Kerala Jamiyyathul Ulama
Pangil Ahmed Kutty Musliyar, scholar hailing from Kerala, is the second president of Samastha Kerala Jamiyyathul Ulama
Thirurangadi Bappu Musliyar, Muslim scholar, poet and of one of the traditionalist Sunni Muslims in Kerala, India
TKM Bava Musliyar, Indian Muslim scholar and the former president of Samastha Kerala Islam Matha Vidyabyasa Board

See also
Muliyar

Religious_degrees
Indian surnames